Mauerbach is a town on the western boundary of Vienna, Austria.

Population

Sights
It hosts the summer houses of many rich Viennese families as well as Mauerbach Charterhouse (Kartause Mauerbach), a Carthusian monastery founded in 1313, closed in 1782.

Sport
The village is also home to association football team SC Mauerbach, who play in Austria's lower leagues.

Recent times
Since 2017 the town belongs to the district of St. Pölten. It was formerly in Wien-Umgebung which was dissolved in 2016.

References

Cities and towns in St. Pölten-Land District